Capitán Av. Juan Cochamanidis Airport is an airport serving San Ignacio de Velasco in the Santa Cruz Department of Bolivia. The runway is within the town.

The San Ignacio De Velasco non-directional beacon (Ident: SNG) is located on the field.

See also

Transport in Bolivia
List of airports in Bolivia

References

External links 
OpenStreetMap - San Ignacio
OurAirports - San Ignacio
SkyVector - San Ignacio
Fallingrain - San Ignacio Airport

Airports in Santa Cruz Department (Bolivia)